Edgbaston Archery and Lawn Tennis Society, informally known as The Archery and based in the Edgbaston area of Birmingham, England, is the oldest lawn tennis club in the world.

The club was founded as an archery club called the Edgbaston Archery Society in 1860 following a meeting at the Birmingham and Midland Institute, and the club moved to its current premises next to Birmingham Botanical Gardens in 1867. The game of croquet was introduced from 1870, with the society's name being amended to reflect this.

It is not known exactly when tennis was established as part of the club's activities. The game itself was developed by Harry Gem and his friend Augurio Perera in Edgbaston between 1859 and 1865, but although Gem was a member of The Archery from 1864 to 1869 there is no proof that he directly introduced the game to the club in this period, and the short-lived tennis club that Gem and Perera established in Leamington Spa in 1872 is the first that can be shown to have existed. The Archery's fixture card for 1875 shows tennis to have been well-established by this date, however, which makes The Archery the oldest still to survive.

External links
EALTS - Edgbaston Archery and Lawn Tennis Society Official website

References

Sport in Birmingham, West Midlands
Tennis venues in England
Sports clubs established in 1868
Edgbaston
Tennis clubs
Archery organizations